Vale Township is one of the two townships of Butte County, South Dakota, United States; most of the rest of the county is unorganized territory.  It lies in the southern part of the county.

External links
Official map by the United States Census Bureau; Butte County listed on page 3

Townships in Butte County, South Dakota
Townships in South Dakota